The Pacific Age is the seventh studio album by English electronic band Orchestral Manoeuvres in the Dark (OMD), released on 29 September 1986 by Virgin Records. It was the last of two OMD albums produced by Stephen Hague, after Crush (1985). The record exhibits the same refined production values as its predecessor while venturing into the realm of mid-1980s sophisti-pop, retreating further from the group's experimental beginnings.

Working under increasing record label pressure and weathering a creative drought, the band committed each new song to the album with limited deliberation. The Pacific Age met with a largely negative reaction from British critics, but has received acclaim in a number of North American publications. It was a Top 20 entry in the UK, Canada and New Zealand, as well as in multiple European countries. Lead single "(Forever) Live and Die" became the group's second Top 20 hit in the US.

Recording sessions for The Pacific Age were fraught with conflict and debauchery. It would be the last OMD studio album for five years, and the last to feature co-founder Paul Humphreys until 2010's History of Modern. The record has been dismissed by the band, with frontman Andy McCluskey calling it OMD's "musical nadir".

Background
Despite the gruelling recording and promotion schedule for predecessor Crush (1985), OMD's American label, A&M Records, wanted a new album as soon as possible in order to capitalise on the success of 1986 hit single "If You Leave" (from the John Hughes film Pretty in Pink). Afforded only two months to write a record, the band continued their focus on breaking the US market with more accessible pop material, while restricting the experimental tendencies of their earlier work. The group again collaborated with producer Stephen Hague, albeit with the addition of his engineer, Tom Lord-Alge. This ensemble worked out of Studio de la Grande Armée in Paris, building upon the band's earlier recordings at Liverpool's Amazon Studios.

OMD committed each new song to The Pacific Age with limited deliberation, while relying on some recent compositions for other projects. "We Love You" had been written for the film Playing for Keeps (1986). "Goddess of Love" was the group's original contribution to Pretty in Pink, but a rewrite of the film's climax rendered the track unsuitable (hence the creation of "If You Leave"). The band reworked the song for inclusion on the album, including rewriting the lyric. One older track, "Southern" (which sampled Martin Luther King Jr.'s final speech in 1968), was included after failing to make the cut for Crush. Despite A&M's wishes, the group neglected to include "If You Leave" on the record.

"Flame of Hope" uses Japanese TV commercial samples left over from the making of the Crush title track. "The Pacific Age" itself was based on the rising prominence of East Asia in world economics. The songs "Cajun Moon" and "Cut Me Down" were almost featured, but according to McCluskey, "democracy won out". Both songs were later included on the band's 40th anniversary retrospective boxset, Souvenir (2019), which carries a CD of unreleased tracks. 1983 holdover "Heaven Is" was nudged off The Pacific Age in favour of "Flame of Hope", but the track eventually surfaced on 1993's Liberator. Humphreys recalled trying to compose satisfactory material amid a creative drought, saying, "It felt incredibly rushed... we'd run out of ideas; there were no songs left in the well." Sessions were marred by exhaustion, internal conflicts, and excessive consumption of drugs and alcohol.

For the first time, brothers Graham and Neil Weir were formally credited as members of OMD; "Shame" was born out of Graham's desire to add a "soulful" element to the album. The Weirs had been involved with the band as session musicians since the re-recording of "Julia's Song" in 1984 (a "Talking Loud and Clear" single B-side), and were credited as "also playing" musicians on Crush. The Pacific Age features various session players, including guitarist Kamil Rustam and vocalist Carole Fredericks.

The group intended to release "Stay (The Black Rose and the Universal Wheel)" as the first single, but Virgin pushed for "Shame" instead; "(Forever) Live and Die" was ultimately the first release. "We Love You" was issued as the second single. Virgin then scheduled "Shame" as the next single to the surprise of the band, who were on tour at the time.

Artwork
OMD intended to hire Peter Saville as the cover artist, given his contributions to many of the band's earlier artworks. However, Saville's later successes in designing covers for major acts like Peter Gabriel, the Rolling Stones and Wham!, had pushed his asking price beyond OMD's budget. Graphic designer Mick Haggerty had recently returned from Mexico, where he had created various woodblock prints for a publishing company. He was enlisted to apply the same techniques to the Pacific Age cover, whose design was hand-chiselled from a piece of wood. To enhance the notion of a hand-made texture, the artwork was printed on the reverse of the sleeve so that the coarse, unvarnished side was facing outward.

Critical reception

The Pacific Age met with a largely negative reaction from British critics. Robin Smith of Record Mirror wrote, "The Pacific Age is a very flatulent album. It's difficult to digest and burps into life only occasionally. The most palatable songs, like '(Forever) Live and Die' and 'Shame', are surrounded by others that move with the grace of Tina Turner trying to dance in a pair of lead-filled wellies." Smash Hits journalist Nick Kelly observed only "a couple of subversive melodies" among a "morass of passionless synth-rock ditties" and "characterless elevator 'musak'." Melody Maker described the record as "wheezing, crumpled and limp" and "a bitter, bitter disappointment". Paul Simper of Number One was more favourable, allowing that "the music – if not fire incarnate – has at least a warm glow".

There were some positive reviews in North America. The Province Tom Harrison wrote, "The Pacific Age has many more shades and detours than the comparatively simple and lovely '(Forever) Live and Die'. OMD's best record in some time." Ron Fell of the Gavin Report noted "literate, digitally brilliant, pop/progressive music which is both challenging and accessible", adding that the band's "ability to harness the electricity of modern studio technology prevents them from being collared by same." The San Francisco Examiners Tom Lanham identified the album as OMD's most cohesive since Architecture & Morality (1981), observing an "almost magical" rapport between McCluskey and Humphreys. He added, "Each track contains a palatable pop hook cleverly woven into its memorable framework. Potential hits abound." Glen Gore-Smith of the Winnipeg Free Press wrote that The Pacific Age finds OMD "in fine form... adding low-tech elements to its sound, while maintaining the exquisite precision of its ethereal synthpop style."

Other American reviewers were less flattering. Los Angeles Times critic Steve Pond deemed the record to be "bloated" with "unnecessary pomp", and suggested that OMD find "a middle ground between what it used to be and what it's become". Michael T. Lyttle of the Austin American-Statesman called the album "confusing and disappointing", adding that "[Stephen] Hague's labor on The Pacific Age can't bail out sub-par material. Look for no miracles here." In a retrospective article for AllMusic, a more forgiving Dave Connolly wrote, "It's true that tracks like '(Forever) Live and Die', 'Shame', and 'Goddess of Love' are more style than substance, but it's a style that plays to OMD's mastery of melody and mood... The band also continues to string snippets of sound together to create interesting patterns." Billy Manes of Orlando Weekly labelled the record an "underrated opus".

Legacy
The Gavin Report placed The Pacific Age at no. 90 in its "Alternative Top 100" of 1986. StarPhoenix critic Terry Craig listed the album as one of the 10 best of the year; in May 1987, the Los Angeles Times called it one of the five best digitally-recorded CD albums on the market, praising its "dazzling brightness". Slicing Up Eyeballs readers later voted the record the 46th-greatest of 1986, while Diffuser.fm staff ranked it the 38th-best alternative album of the year. It was placed at no. 672 in CMJ's "Top 1000, 1979–1989". Author Anna Smaill cited The Pacific Age – in particular the track "The Dead Girls" – as an influence on her 2015 novel, The Chimes.

Morale issues that arose during the onerous recording and promotion of predecessor Crush (1985), intensified during the making of The Pacific Age. Creative conflicts also came to the fore. These issues preceded a line-up split in the late 1980s; co-founder Humphreys would not appear on another OMD studio album until the group's post-reunion release, History of Modern (2010).

Band response
McCluskey discussed the album in the 2014 book, Mad World: An Oral History of New Wave Artists and Songs That Defined the 1980s:

McCluskey feels that the record's production "just doesn't sound like [OMD]", and has noted that it features tracks he wishes the band had never released. Humphreys stated, "There were a couple of nice things on it, but to us, overall, it didn't work." He pointed to "surrounding circumstances, the time factor and conflicts that were going on".

Track listing
All songs by OMD, as per label.
Writing credits below as per ASCAP database.

Personnel
Orchestral Manoeuvres in the Dark (OMD)
 Paul Humphreys – keyboards, percussion, vocals
 Andy McCluskey – vocals, keyboards, bass guitar
 Malcolm Holmes – drums, percussion
 Martin Cooper – keyboards, saxophone
 Graham Weir – trombone, keyboards, guitar
 Neil Weir – trumpet, bass

Additional musicians
 Stephen Hague – additional keyboards, guitar
 Kamil Rustam – guitar
 Carole Fredericks – backing vocals
 Aliss Terrell – backing vocals
 Yvonne Jones – backing vocals

Charts

Weekly charts

Year-end charts

Certifications

References

External links
 Album lyrics
 

1986 albums
Albums produced by Stephen Hague
Orchestral Manoeuvres in the Dark albums
Virgin Records albums